Faith and Failure is the debut album of Century, released in 2006.

Reception

Track listing 
All songs were written by Century, except where noted.

 "Obsolescence" – 3:39
 "Bilateral Consequence" – 3:28
 "A Threat, Conquistador" (Century, Chad Taylor) – 4:23
 "Back Into the Woodwork" – 2:45
 "The Last Neighborhood in America" – 3:55
 "Watch Them Become Animals" – 3:15
 "Men Eater" – 4:00
 "The Lungs of the Ocean" (Andrew Kintzi, Carson Slovak) – 1:19
 "Kingsnake" – 5:53
 "The Fate of Arbogast" – 3:34

Personnel 
Carson Slovak – guitar, vocals, producer, engineer, artwork, mastering, mixing, layout design, video editor, video director
Mike Giuliano – guitar
Joshua Groah – bass
Grant McFarland – drums
Mike Radka – engineer
Tom Hutten – mastering

References 

2006 albums
Century (American band) albums